Rotherham F.C. could mean one of four football clubs:
Rotherham F.C., founded in December 1870, which originally played to Sheffield rules on the Doncaster Road and which dissolved in around 1878;
Rotherham Town F.C. (1878), a former member of the Football League
Rotherham Town F.C. (1899)
Rotherham United F.C.